Lake Jyväsjärvi is a lake situated in the centre of Jyväskylä in Finland. The lake can be also considered as the Northern end of Lake Päijänne.

Parts of Jyväsjärvi have been filled many times to gain more land for the enlarging city of Jyväskylä. Mattilanniemi and Ylistö, two campuses of the University of Jyväskylä are situated on the Southern shores of the lake. Two bridges are crossing the lake connecting Ylistönrinne and Kuokkala neighbourhoods to the city centre. The harbour of Jyväskylä is situated next to the Kuokkala bridge.

During winter seasons a three kilometres long ice skating track is created on the surface of the lake. There is also a path, popular among pedestrians, cyclists, joggers and rollerbladers, going around the lake.

See also
 Päijänne
 Jyväskylä

References

External links
 Lake Jyväsjärvi in the Jarviwiki Web Service 

Kymi basin
Lakes of Jyväskylä